Bobby "Bobcat" Ervin (born December 13, 1967), professionally known as Bobcat or DJ Bobcat, is an American Grammy Award winner and multi-platinum producer, songwriter, DJ, artist and music executive.

He has worked with Clive Davis, Russell Simmons, Rick Rubin, Lyor Cohen, Steve Rifkind, Madonna, Guy Oseary, Jermaine Dupri, and has written and produced songs for LL Cool J, Ice Cube, Mack 10, Tupac, Mc Ren, Sir Mix A Lot, K9 Posse, Breeze, Nas, King T, Kam, Candyman, and Yo-Yo.

Musical career

Uncle Jamm's Army 
Since the early 1980s Bobcat has been involved in hip hop. He started in Los Angeles with the West Coast icons and pioneers Uncle Jamm's Army, DJing and promoting large dances and concerts for Run–D.M.C., Whodini, Ice-T, and Kurtis Blow, helping, establish the beginning of the hip hop scene on the West Coast.

At the time, Bobcat was only 15 years old, and wasn't even tall enough to reach the turntables, having to stand on a milk crate to DJ. Back then Bobcat didn't own any professional equipment, so when he began working with Big Daddy Productions and Uncle Jamm's Army, Ice T's DJ Chris "The Glove" Taylor had to show him how to use the huge Cerwin Vega Mixer.

Roger Clayton, founder of Uncle Jamm's Army, would fly to the East Coast and pick up the hottest new underground records from various record stores in the city and bring them back to LA. Bobcat and The Egyptian Lover would take those records, play them first and break them at the big Uncle Jamm's Dances, drawing over 15,000 people in the early 1980s.

California Catt Crew
As a member of the highly publicized Uncle Jamm's Army, Bobcat was in popular demand, being booked months in advance and doing two to six parties every weekend. After being overbooked week after week, he decided to form a crew of DJs similar to Uncle Jamm's Army, but with his signature sound and scratching techniques. He formed the California Catt Crew, which included Bobcat, Battlecat, Dr. Scratch Kat, Wild Cat, Cosmic Cat, Alley Cat, Courageous Cat and Kitty Kat. Bobcat helped book the DJs all around Southern California and gave them tips about the business.

At this time Bobcat recorded a 12-inch single with Tracy Kendrick and Courtney Branch of Total Track Productions, including the Bobcat Song & the California Catt Crew.

1580 KDAY/Mix Masters
Bobcat, along with Uncle Jamm's Army, Greg Mack and Jack Patterson, helped pioneer the world's first 24-hour hip hop radio station, 1580 KDAY, changing the entire format of radio, introducing and pioneering the Saturday Night Mix Show and Traffic Jam. At the time, radio was traditional R&B and was playing very little rap. Bobcat thought of the idea, concept and name "Mix Masters" for Greg Mack at 1580 KDAY. The new format caused a national and international domino effect, changing various stations' view of hip hop and subsequently their format.

Uncle Jamm's Army and the Wrecking Crew are the forefathers of West Coast hip hop. The Mix Masters were the next generation.

Def Jam/Bigger & Deffer 
After dominating the West Coast hip hop scene, Bobcat with his crew L.A. Posse flew to New York City and began working with rap mogul Russell Simmons, Lyor Cohen and Def Jam Records, writing and producing tracks for LL Cool J including "I Need Love", "I'm Bad", "Jack the Ripper", "Kanday", "Get Down", "Go Cut Creator Go" and "The Do Wop". The album Bigger and Deffer sold over 3 million copies, and is considered some of LL Cool J's best work.

"I Need Love" 

Bobcat wrote the melody to "I Need Love" when he was 16 years old. It was originally a song titled "Friends By Day, Lovers By Night", Bobcat's version of "Secret Lovers" by Atlantic Starr.

"I Need Love" has been sampled and remade more than any other rap song in history. It has been sampled or replayed by Jermaine Dupri, Usher, Master P, Kris Kross and countless others.

Blender Magazine voted it the greatest rap song ever made.

Def Jam tour
LL Cool J asked Bobcat to go on the now world-famous Def Jam Tour. Bobcat signed on as DJ/music supervisor, and also designed and choreographed LL's stage shows. He toured all over the world, DJing and overseeing the sound and lighting.

The Def Jam Tour was one of the highest-grossing hip hop tours in history, grossing over $20 million in ticket sales worldwide. The tour toured all over the US and Europe, doing huge sold-out shows around the country including at the LA Sports Arena, the Omni in Atlanta and Madison Square Garden in New York. The Def Jam Tour featured Eric B & Rakim, Public Enemy, DJ Jazzy Jeff & The Fresh Prince, Whodini, KRS-One, N.W.A, Salt N Pepa, Kool Moe Dee, Run–D.M.C., Stetsasonic, and LL Cool J, the headline act.

Cat Got Ya Tongue
Bobcat became an Arista recording artist and toured around the country performing his album, Cat Got Ya Tongue, on the same stage with New Edition and Jody Watley.

That same year Bobcat was presented with a proclamation by the Atlanta City Council for making a positive album and being a positive influence and role model for the community.

Business ventures

The Foundation 
Bobcat and his wife Chanel Ervin started a global entertainment agency and strategic marketing firm titled The Foundation. This global network primarily focuses on DJs and producers, and also markets and promotes new and established recording artists.

The Digital Record Pool
The Digital Record Pool is an online music marketing service and online community for recording artists that has thousands of DJs, MDs, PDs, tastemakers, music lovers, music producers, journalists and bloggers from around the world. Bobcat is the founder/CEO, and says this site and service were created to help new artists and indie labels around the world get maximum exposure.

Digital DJ team
Bobcat and the Foundation Entertainment Agency launched an international DJ team for the purpose of promoting new music, media, brands, goods and technologies Globally. Bobcat is founder and general manager, His wife, Chanel Ervin, is the President of Marketing.

Discography 

 Bigger and Deffer (1987)
 K-9 Posse (1988)
 I'm Gonna Git You Sucka (1988)
 Act a Fool (1988)
 Cat Got Ya Tongue (1989)
 Mama Said Knock You Out (1990)
 The Hard Way (1991)
 Death Certificate (1991)
 Black Pearl (1992)
 Kizz My Black Azz (1992)
 5150: Home 4 tha Sick (1992)
 The Predator (1992)
 Sickinnahead (1993)
 Strictly 4 My N.I.G.G.A.Z. (1993)
 14 Shots to the Dome (1993)
 Mitsou (1993)
 State Of Emergency: Society In Crisis Vol. 1 (1994)
 Tha Life of a Hoodlum (1995)
 Mista Grimm (1995)
 Str8 off tha Streetz of Muthaphukkin Compton (1996)
 All Eyez On Me (1996)
 Based on a True Story (1997)
 Ruthless for Life (1998)
 Mean Green (1998)
 J.E. Heartbreak (2000)
 Beware of Dog (2000)
 The Exodus (2002)
 Hip Hop Is Dead (2006)

References

External links 
Bobcat – official U.S. website
The Digital Record Pool – official U.S. website
The Digital Record Pool Corporate Site – official U.S. website
The Foundation Entertainment Agency – official U.S. website

1967 births
Living people
African-American businesspeople
African-American record producers
American hip hop record producers
American music industry executives
Grammy Award winners
American hip hop DJs
21st-century African-American people
20th-century African-American people